Maromaku is a locality in the Northland Region of the North Island of New Zealand. Kawakawa is north, and Towai is southeast.  runs past Maromaku to the north, and the North Auckland Line runs through it.

Demographics
The SA1 area is part of the larger Maromaku statistical area.

Maromaku locality had a population of 162 at the 2018 New Zealand census, an increase of 12 people (8.0%) since the 2013 census, and a decrease of 12 people (−6.9%) since the 2006 census. There were 60 households, comprising 87 males and 78 females, giving a sex ratio of 1.12 males per female. The median age was 38.4 years (compared with 37.4 years nationally), with 36 people (22.2%) aged under 15 years, 27 (16.7%) aged 15 to 29, 78 (48.1%) aged 30 to 64, and 15 (9.3%) aged 65 or older.

Ethnicities were 87.0% European/Pākehā, 37.0% Māori, 5.6% Pacific peoples, 1.9% Asian, and 3.7% other ethnicities. People may identify with more than one ethnicity.

Although some people chose not to answer the census's question about religious affiliation, 51.9% had no religion, 35.2% were Christian and 1.9% had other religions.

Of those at least 15 years old, 9 (7.1%) people had a bachelor's or higher degree, and 30 (23.8%) people had no formal qualifications. The median income was $27,600, compared with $31,800 nationally. 15 people (11.9%) earned over $70,000 compared to 17.2% nationally. The employment status of those at least 15 was that 69 (54.8%) people were employed full-time, 21 (16.7%) were part-time, and 6 (4.8%) were unemployed.

Maromaku statistical area

Maromaku statistical area had a population of 774 at the 2018 New Zealand census, an increase of 108 people (16.2%) since the 2013 census, and an increase of 60 people (8.4%) since the 2006 census. There were 249 households, comprising 375 males and 399 females, giving a sex ratio of 0.94 males per female. The median age was 38.4 years (compared with 37.4 years nationally), with 216 people (27.9%) aged under 15 years, 123 (15.9%) aged 15 to 29, 333 (43.0%) aged 30 to 64, and 105 (13.6%) aged 65 or older.

Ethnicities were 74.0% European/Pākehā, 45.7% Māori, 4.3% Pacific peoples, 2.3% Asian, and 3.5% other ethnicities. People may identify with more than one ethnicity.

The percentage of people born overseas was 7.8, compared with 27.1% nationally.

Although some people chose not to answer the census's question about religious affiliation, 46.5% had no religion, 37.6% were Christian, 3.1% had Māori religious beliefs and 2.3% had other religions.

Of those at least 15 years old, 54 (9.7%) people had a bachelor's or higher degree, and 132 (23.7%) people had no formal qualifications. The median income was $26,300, compared with $31,800 nationally. 57 people (10.2%) earned over $70,000 compared to 17.2% nationally. The employment status of those at least 15 was that 288 (51.6%) people were employed full-time, 81 (14.5%) were part-time, and 36 (6.5%) were unemployed.

Education
Maromaku School is a coeducational primary school (years 1-8) with a roll of  students as of  A school first opened in Maromaku in 1891. Towai Primary School closed in January 2005, with students moving to Maromaku School.

References

Far North District
Populated places in the Northland Region